Phlias (Ancient Greek: Φλίας) or Phlius  or Phliasus  was the son of Dionysus and Chthonophyle in Greek mythology. A native of Araithyrea in Argolis, he is mentioned as one of the Argonauts.

Family 
Pausanias cites a version in which Phlias is given as son of Ceisus, but himself maintains that Phlias was the son of Dionysus by Araethyrea (daughter of Aras), whereas Chthonophyle was his wife and mother of his son Androdamas. Hyginus calls him Phliasus, and a son of Dionysus and Ariadne. In the Argonautica Orphica, it is simply stated that his mother was a nymph, without mention of her name. The town of Phlius (formerly called Araithyrea) was believed to have derived its name from him.

Notes

References 
 Apollonius Rhodius, Argonautica translated by Robert Cooper Seaton (1853-1915), R. C. Loeb Classical Library Volume 001. London, William Heinemann Ltd, 1912. Online version at the Topos Text Project.
 Apollonius Rhodius, Argonautica. George W. Mooney. London. Longmans, Green. 1912. Greek text available at the Perseus Digital Library.
 Gaius Julius Hyginus, Fabulae from The Myths of Hyginus translated and edited by Mary Grant. University of Kansas Publications in Humanistic Studies. Online version at the Topos Text Project.
 Gaius Valerius Flaccus, Argonautica translated by Mozley, J H. Loeb Classical Library Volume 286. Cambridge, MA, Harvard University Press; London, William Heinemann Ltd. 1928. Online version at theio.com.
 Gaius Valerius Flaccus, Argonauticon. Otto Kramer. Leipzig. Teubner. 1913. Latin text available at the Perseus Digital Library.
 The Orphic Argonautica, translated by Jason Colavito. © Copyright 2011. Online version at the Topos Text Project.
Pausanias, Description of Greece with an English Translation by W.H.S. Jones, Litt.D., and H.A. Ormerod, M.A., in 4 Volumes. Cambridge, MA, Harvard University Press; London, William Heinemann Ltd. 1918. . Online version at the Perseus Digital Library
 Pausanias, Graeciae Descriptio. 3 vols. Leipzig, Teubner. 1903.  Greek text available at the Perseus Digital Library.

Argonauts
Children of Dionysus
Demigods in classical mythology
Characters in the Argonautica

Sicyonian characters in Greek mythology